Naville is a French surname. People with the name include:

 Denise Naville (1896–1979), French writer and translator
 Édouard Naville (1844–1926), Swiss archaeologist, Egyptologist and Biblical scholar
 François Naville (1883–1968), Swiss physician
 Marguerite Naville (1852–1930), Swiss artist, photographer and writer
 Pierre Naville (1903–1993), French Surrealist writer and sociologist

See also
 Navile, a canal in Emilia-Romagna, northern Italy
 Neville (name)